SMSI may refer to:
 Strong metal-support interaction, a phenomenon in catalysis
 The NASDAQ symbol for Smith Micro Software